The Western Design Center (WDC) W65C134S is an 8-bit CMOS microcontroller based on a W65C02S processor core, which is a superset of the MOS Technology 6502 processor.

The W65C134S consists of a fully static 8-bit W65C02S CPU core, 4 KB of ROM containing a machine language monitor, 192 bytes of SRAM, two 16 bit timers, one 16-bit Watch-Dog Timer (WDT) with "restart" interrupt, one UART with baud rate timer, a low power Serial Interface Bus (SIB) configured as a token passing Local Area Network, twenty-two priority encoded interrupts, two crystal inputs (slow 32.768KHz and fast up to 8-MHz), Bus Control Register (BCR) for external memory bus control, interface circuitry for peripheral devices, and many low power features.  The W65C134S has been developed for high-reliability applications, as well as where minimum power is required.

Features
CMOS low power process 
Operating ambient temperature range of -40 °C to +85 °C
Single 2.8V to 5.5V power supply 
Static to 8 MHz clock operation, as well as 32.768KHz capability
W65C02S compatible CPU
8-bit parallel processing 
Variable length stack 
True indexing capability 
Fifteen addressing modes 
Decimal or binary arithmetic 
Pipeline architecture 
Fully static CPU 
Single chip microcomputer 
Many power saving features 
56 CMOS compatible I/O lines 
4096 x 8 ROM on chip 
192 x 8 RAM on chip 
Low power modes 
WAIt for interrupt 
SToP the clock 
Fast oscillator start and stop feature 
Twenty-two priority encoded interrupts 
BRK software interrupt 
RESET "RESTART" interrupt 
NMIB Non-Maskable Interrupt input 
SIB Interrupt 
IRQ1B level interrupt input 
IRQ2B level interrupt input 
2 timer edge interrupts 
7 positive edge interrupt inputs 
5 negative edge interrupt inputs 
Asynchronous Receiver Interrupt 
Asynchronous Transmitter Interrupt 
UART 7/8-bit w/wo odd or even parity 
16M byte segmented address space 
64K byte linear address space 
4 x 16 bit timer/counter 
Bus control register for external memory 
Internal or external ROM 
8 Decoded Chip Select outputs 
Surface mount 68 and 80 lead packages 
Real time clock features 
Time of Day (ToD) clock features

See also
 WDC 65C265 - a 16-bit microcontroller based around a WDC 65C816 processor core

References

Further reading

External links
 W65C134S webpage - Western Design Center (WDC)
 W65C134S datasheet - WDC
 W65C134S monitor ROM manual - WDC

65xx microprocessors
8-bit microprocessors